Lieutenant Colonel Frederick Augustus Smith VC (18 November 1826 – 22 July 1887) was a British Army officer and an Irish recipient of the Victoria Cross, the highest award for gallantry in the face of the enemy that can be awarded to British and Commonwealth forces.

Early life and career
Born in Dublin on 18 November 1826, Smith was commissioned as an ensign into the 1st Regiment of Foot (Royal Scots) on 1 January 1849. He was promoted to lieutenant on 30 April 1852. He saw action during the Crimean War at Alma, Inkerman and Sebastopol and was promoted to captain on 30 March 1855. He later transferred to the 43rd (Monmouthshire) Regiment of Foot.

Victoria Cross
Smith was 37 years old, and a captain in the 43rd (Monmouthshire) Regiment of Foot (later the Oxfordshire and Buckinghamshire Light Infantry), during the Waikato-Hauhau Maori War in New Zealand.

The 68th (Durham) Regiment of Foot (Light Infantry) with a detachment of the 43rd commanded by Smith was deployed to attack an entrenchment held by the Māori. The following deed took place during the attack on 21 June 1864 at Tauranga for which he was awarded the VC.

In the charge he was struck by a bullet which lodged in the upper part of his leg. He continued to lead his men and was the first man into the entrenchment. Following fierce fighting, the Māori having sustained heavy casualties were driven from their position. In the attack Smith killed one of the Māori Chiefs and took possession of his baton known as a Mere. The Chief's family subsequently offered substantial sums of money to retrieve the Mere. After Smith's death the Mere was eventually returned to a museum in New Zealand; a relic of the British Army's wars in that country.

He was also mentioned in dispatches.

Later career
He later achieved the rank of lieutenant colonel. He commanded the 43rd Foot from 1 December 1875 to 2 February 1878 when he retired from the army.

He died in Duleek, Co Meath, 22 July 1887. His grave (unmarked) is in Duleek (Church of Ireland) Churchyard, Co Meath. A memorial plaque to him, originally in Duleek Church, is now situated in Kilmore Church, standing in the Ulster Folk and Transport Museum, Cultra, Co Down.
 
It was Norman and Eileen Irvine and their son David (Irish Guards) from Carrickfergus, Co. Antrim who rescued the marble plaque from ruin in the Duleek church. The Ox and Bucks regiment wished to have it but it was decided to have it stay in Ireland.

References

External links

Location of grave and VC medal (Co. Meath, Ireland)

Irish recipients of the Victoria Cross
1826 births
1887 deaths
19th-century Irish people
Irish officers in the British Army
43rd Regiment of Foot officers
British military personnel of the New Zealand Wars
New Zealand Wars recipients of the Victoria Cross
Military personnel from Dublin (city)
People from County Meath
British Army personnel of the Crimean War
British Army recipients of the Victoria Cross